Cumulative voting (also accumulation voting, weighted voting or multi-voting) is a multiple-winner method intended to promote more proportional representation than winner-take-all elections such as block voting or first past the post. Cumulative voting is used frequently in corporate governance, where it is mandated by some (7) U.S. states (see e.g., Minn. Stat. Sec. 302A.111 subd. 2(d).).

History 
Cumulative voting was used to elect the Illinois House of Representatives from 1870 until its repeal in 1980 and used in England and Scotland in the late 19th century to elect some school boards. As of March 2012, more than fifty communities in the United States use cumulative voting, all resulting from cases brought under the National Voting Rights Act of 1965. Among them are Peoria, Illinois for half of its city council, Chilton County, Alabama for its county council and school board, and Amarillo, Texas, for its school board and College Board of Regents. Courts sometimes mandate its use as a remedy in lawsuits brought under the Voting Rights Act in the United States; an example of this occurred in 2009 in Port Chester, New York, which had its first cumulative voting elections for its board of trustees in 2010.

Cumulative voting was also used to elect city boards in Toronto, Canada starting in 1903. The Proportional Representation Review (September 1903) described it like this:

A form of cumulative voting has been used by group facilitators as a method to collectively prioritize options, for example ideas generated from a brainstorming session within a workshop. This approach is described as "multi-voting" and was likely derived from the nominal group technique and is one of many tools suggested within the Six Sigma business management strategy.

Voting 

A cumulative voting election permits voters in an election for more than one seat to put more than one vote on a preferred candidate. When voters in the minority concentrate their votes in this way, it increases their chances of obtaining representation in a legislative body. This is different from bloc voting, where a voter may not vote more than once for any candidate and the largest single block, even if less than 50 percent can control 100% of representation elected in the district.

Ballots used for cumulative voting differ both in the ways voters mark their selections and in the degree to which voters are permitted to split their own votes. Possibly the simplest ballot uses the equal and even cumulative voting method, where a voter simply marks preferred candidates, as in bloc voting, and votes are then automatically distributed evenly among those preferred candidates. Voters are unable to specify a differing level of support for a more preferred candidate, giving them less flexibility although making it tactically easier to support a slate of candidates.

A more common and slightly more complex cumulative ballot uses a points method. Under this method, voters are given an explicit number of points (often referred to as "votes" because in most governmental elections held today, the number of points (votes) that each voter can cast equals the number of seats to be elected, although this is not a hard and fast rule historically -- Limited Voting is an example of a system where voters cast fewer votes than the number of seats to fill). Voters then distribute their points (votes) amongst one or more candidates on the ballot. Typically, this is done with a voter making a mark for each point beside the desired candidate. A similar method is to have the voter write in the desired number of points next to each candidate. This latter approach is commonly used for corporate elections involving a large number of points on a given ballot, where the voter is given one set of points for each votable share of stock he has in the company. Unless an appropriately programmed electronic voting system is used, however, this write-in ballot type burdens the voter with ensuring that his point allocations add up to his allotted sum.  However, it should not be necessary that a voter use up all his allotment, since it would be more important that voting systems not allow the voter's allotted sum to be exceeded.

When used as a facilitation technique for group decision-making this process is often called “multi-voting”. Participants are given stickers or points which they can apply among a list of options; often these are ideas that were generated by the group. Because dot stickers are commonly used for multi-voting, the process is also often called dot voting.

In typical cumulative elections using the points method, the number of points allotted to a voter is equal to the number of winning candidates. This allows a voter potentially to express some support for all winning candidates; however, this need not be required to achieve proportional representation.  With only one point the method becomes equivalent to a single non-transferable vote in a first-past-the-post method.

Other than general egalitarian concerns of electoral equality, there is nothing in this method that requires each voter to be given the same number of points. If certain voters are seen as more deserving of influence, for example because they own more shares of stock in the company, they can be directly assigned more points per voter. Rarely, this explicit method of granting particular voters more influence is advocated for governmental elections outside corporate management, perhaps because the voters are members of an oppressed group; currently, all governmental elections with cumulative voting award equal numbers of points for all voters.

Unlike choice voting where the numbers represent the order of a voter's ranking of candidates (i.e. they are ordinal numbers), in cumulative votes the numbers represent quantities (i.e. they are cardinal numbers).

While giving voters more points may appear to give them a greater ability to graduate their support for individual candidates, it is not obvious that it changes the democratic structure of the method.

The most flexible ballot (not the easiest to use) allows a full vote to be divided in any fraction among all candidates, so long as the fractions add to less than or equal to 1. (The value of this flexibility is questionable since voters don't know where their vote is most needed.)

Advocates of cumulative voting often argue that political and racial minorities deserve better representation. By concentrating their votes on a small number of candidates of their choice, voters in the minority can win some representation—for example, a like-minded grouping of voters that is 20% of a city would be well-positioned to elect one out of five seats. Both forms of cumulative voting achieve this objective.

In a corporate setting, challengers of cumulative voting argue that the board of directors gets divided and this hurts the company's long term profit. Using a staggered board of directors can diminish the ability of minority factions to obtain representation by reducing the number of seats up for election at any given time.

Robert's Rules of Order Newly Revised, which asserts a principle that the majority should have the right to make all decisions, states, "A minority group, by coordinating its effort in voting for only one candidate who is a member of the group, may be able to secure the election of that candidate as a minority member of the board. However, this method of voting, which permits a member to cast multiple votes for a single candidate, must be viewed with reservation since it violates a fundamental principle of [US] parliamentary law that each member is entitled to one and only one vote on a question."

Voting method criteria 
Comparative academic analysis of voting methods usually centers on certain voting method criteria.

Cumulative voting satisfies the monotonicity criterion, the participation criterion, the consistency criterion, and reversal symmetry. Cumulative voting does not satisfy independence of irrelevant alternatives, later-no-harm criterion nor the Condorcet criterion. It does not satisfy the plurality criterion. The 11th edition of Robert's Rules of Order Newly Revised states, "If it is desired to elect by mail, by plurality vote, by preferential voting, or by cumulative voting, this must be expressly stated, and necessary details of the procedure should be prescribed (see 45)." (Emphasis added). Robert's Rules describes the cumulative voting process. It provides that, "A minority group, by coordinating its effort in voting for only one candidate who is a member of the group, may be able to secure the election of that candidate as a minority member of the board." (Emphasis added). Thus, cumulative voting, when permitted, is a right to accumulate or stack votes but not a guarantee that this stacking will meet or override other election criteria such as a majority vote or majority present.

Use 

The Norfolk Legislative Assembly on Norfolk Island was elected using a form of cumulative voting where voters cannot give all their votes to one candidate. It is also used heavily in corporate governance, where it is mandated by seven U.S. states, and it was used to elect the Illinois House of Representatives from 1870 until 1980. It was used in England between 1870 and 1902, under the Elementary Education Act 1870, to elect school boards. Starting in the late 1980s, it has been adopted in a growing number of jurisdictions in the United States, in each case to resolve a lawsuit brought against bloc voting methods.

With strategic voting, one can calculate how many shares are needed to elect a certain number of candidates, and to determine how many candidates a person holding a certain number of shares can elect.

The formula to determine the number of shares necessary to elect a majority of directors is:

where
X = number of shares needed to elect a given number of directors
S = total number of shares at the meeting
N = number of directors needed
D = total number of directors to be elected

The formula to determine how many directors can be elected by a faction controlling a certain number of shares is:

with N becoming the number of directors which can be elected and X the number of shares controlled. This inequality is correct under all circumstances. Under most reasonable circumstances, however, an approximation may be used to the value for N, by reducing the number of shares by 1:

This approximation addresses the case where the right side of the inequality is an integer. By reducing the number of shares by one, the number of directors is reduced in the equation compared to the inequality. Under reasonable circumstances, the number of directors is reduced by one, yielding the correct answer. This approximation fails however under certain circumstances, such as when the number of shares is 1.

This is equivalent to the Droop quota for each seat desired. 

However this is not a hard and fast rule. In Illinois State House of Representative elections, in the 1st District, conducted using CV, the proportion of voters taken by successful candidates varied from 31 percent to 20 percent in the 1956-1966 period.

Some Bugzilla installations allow the use of cumulative voting to decide which software bugs most urgently need correcting.

Tactical voting 
Voters in a cumulative election can employ different strategies for allocating their vote.

Plumper votes

Limiting the spread of your votes (plumping) can by done under CV by allotting multiple votes to the same candidate. This will help to make that individual more likely to win. The issue of "Plumper Votes" was much to the fore in the early 18th century, when a candidate such as Sir Richard Child was returned for Essex in 1710 with 90% of his votes having been "Plumpers". This was therefore a sign of his high popularity with those voters. 
The term is defined by the Oxford English Dictionary as: (verb) "to vote plump, to vote straight or without any qualification", (attrib.noun) "plumper vote, a vote given solely to one candidate at an election (when one has the right to vote for 2 or more)".

Voters typically award most, if not all, of their votes to their most preferred candidate.

Spread-out votes
Conversely, spreading out votes can increase the number of like-minded candidates who are elected.

The strategy of voters should be to balance how strong their preferences for individual candidates are against how close those candidates will be to the number of votes needed to win.  Consequently, it is beneficial for voters to have good information about the relative support levels of various candidates, such as through opinion polling.

Comparison with single transferable voting 
Some supporters of the single transferable vote (STV) method describe STV as a form of cumulative voting with fractional votes. The difference is that the STV method itself determines the fractions based on a rank preference ballot from voters and interactions with the preferences of other voters. (The whole-vote form of STV does not use fractional votes.)  

Under cumulative voting, a voter may split his or her votes in such a way as to hurt their strongest preferred choice. The ranked choice format of the STV ballot makes it impossible for voters to split their votes among candidates in a manner that hurts their strongest preferred choice. This is because in most systems of STV, no second choice is considered until the first choice candidate has been elected or eliminated. 

With cumulative voting, it is possible to "waste" votes by giving some candidates more votes than necessary to win and by splitting the vote among multiple candidates such that none of them win. Under STV, as circumstances permit, surplus votes are transferred away from successful candidates and votes can be concentrated behind a lesser number of candidates to ensure some representation is elected by a particular voting group.

CV is harder to count on some voting equipment, but is easier for voters on strategic grounds if they are unsure about which of their favored candidates needs more of their votes. It also makes it nearly impossible to cast an invalid ballot, although in practice a jurisdiction still may want to limit the number of marks to the number of seats being contested.

See also
 Voting systems
 Panachage
 Quadratic voting

Notes

External links 
The Midwest Democracy Center
 Cumulative voting page at FairVote - Center for Voting and Democracy
A Handbook of Electoral System Design from International IDEA
Electoral Design Reference Materials from the ACE Project
Port Chester (NY) voter education site

Semi-proportional electoral systems